The 2007 Great Yarmouth Borough Council election took place on 3 May 2007 to elect members of Great Yarmouth Borough Council in Norfolk, England. One third of the council was up for election and the Conservative Party stayed in overall control of the council.

After the election, the composition of the council was:
Conservative 22
Labour 17

Background
Before the election the Conservatives ran the council with 22 seats, compared to 16 for Labour. There was also a former Conservative, John Hudson in West Flegg, who stood down at the election.

Among the candidates at the election were the wives of the Conservative and Labour leaders on the council, Mary Coleman and Hilary Wainwright, standing against each other in West Flegg, and the wife of Labour Member of Parliament Tony Wright, Barbara Wright contesting Fleggburgh. The election was mainly contested between the Conservative and Labour parties, but there were also candidates from the Green Party, United Kingdom Independence Party, Liberal Democrats and National Front.

Election result
Overall turnout at the election was 31.58%.

Ward results

References

2007 English local elections
2007
2000s in Norfolk